The Purcell Trench, also known as the Kootenay River Valley is a large valley on the western side of the northern part of North America's Rocky Mountains. It joins the Rocky Mountain Trench another  northward at the south tip of Kinbasket Lake, in British Columbia. The trench is nearly a straight north or south line. Some of its topography has been carved into U-shaped glacial valleys, it is primarily a product of geologic faulting. The trench splits the Columbia Mountains between the Purcell Mountains on the east and the Selkirk Mountains on the west.

Geology
The Priest River complex in northern Idaho, northeastern Washington, and southeastern British Columbia is a series of early and middle Eocene metamorphic core complexes that extend southward from the south-central Canadian Cordillera to the Columbia Plateau and southeastward to the Idaho Batholith. The east side of the Priest River complex on forms the west wall of the Purcell Trench.

Purcell Trench Faults
The Purcell Trench is divided into three segments. The southern segment, which extends from Lake Coeur d'Alene through Sandpoint to north of Colburn, contains compelling evidence of the east-dipping Purcell Trench normal fault. The middle segment, which extends from Colburn and Naples, is unfaulted. The northern segment from Naples to Kootenay Lake also contains evidence of a major eastdipping normal fault.

Glaciation
The width and depth of the inner valley of the Kootenai River in Boundary County, Idaho, when the first glaciers arrived is unknown. There were at least three glacial invasions with their associated receding ice fronts. As of 1953 it was not possible to differentiate the effects of the earlier Illinoian and earlier glacial periods below Bonners Ferry from those of the Wisconsin glaciation period. It appears doubtful that the pre-Wisconsin ice sheets of the Cordilleran ice sheet reach to the valley of the Pend Oreille River.

See also
 Rocky Mountain Trench

References

Geography of British Columbia
Geography of Idaho